Ceryx pleurostictoides is a moth of the  subfamily Arctiinae. It was described by Strand in 1915. It is found in Taiwan.

References

Ceryx (moth)
Moths described in 1915